The 2011 Chicago Red Stars season is the third season of the soccer club, and the only season it competed in Women's Premier Soccer League.

Major events
After the 2010 season the Red Stars could not come up with the security bond for the WPS league on April 7, 2011 the CRS informed its fans that they would not able to return for the 2011 WPS season.

To continue the brand name the team dropped down one level to the WPSL to continue playing for the 2011 season with hope of returning to WPS in 2012.

Squad

First-team squad

Squad correct as of September 5, 2011

Transfers

In

Out

Club

Management

Competitions

Midwest Conference

North Division

Source:

Matches

WPSL regular season

Source:

WPSL playoffs

Source:

Statistics

Golden Boot

Source: wpsl.info

Other information

References

American soccer clubs 2011 season
2011
2011 Women's Professional Soccer season
2011 in sports in Illinois